Alberto Ramírez Torres (born February 2, 1986) is a former Mexican footballer, as a midfielder for AC Kajaani. He has also played for the Mexico national team at the youth level.

Career

Tecos UAG
Ramírez made his competitive debut for Tecos UAG on 8 February 2004, in the club's Primera División; 1–1 draw against Club América. He played six years for Tecos.

FC Inter Turku
Ramírez joined Inter Turku in April 2009, just a few weeks before the start of the season. He signed for one season with the current Finnish champion after a try-out.

International career
Ramírez was named captain of Mexico U-17 in the 2003 FIFA U-17 World Championship held in Finland. There, he played as a playmaker and took the team to the quarter-finals, where they lost to Argentina. Mexico's coach Humberto Grondona, thought Ramírez was his best player in the competition.

In 2005, he was selected for the under-21 national squad for a tournament in Toulon.

References

Guardian Football
ops.fi

External links

1986 births
Living people
Mexico international footballers
Expatriate footballers in Finland
Mexican expatriate footballers
Tecos F.C. footballers
FC Inter Turku players
Ballenas Galeana Morelos footballers
Club Atlético Zacatepec players
Alebrijes de Oaxaca players
Liga MX players
Ascenso MX players
Ykkönen players
Association football midfielders
AC Kajaani players
Veikkausliiga players
Footballers from Jalisco
People from Puerto Vallarta
Mexican footballers